Josephine Rathbone may refer to:
 Josephine Adams Rathbone, American librarian
 Josephine Langworthy Rathbone, American physiologist